The 1956 Aintree 200 was a non-championship Formula One race held on 21 April 1956. The race was won by Stirling Moss, in a privately entered Maserati 250F.

Entry list

Results

Qualifying

Race

References

BARC Aintree 200
BARC Aintree 200
BARC Aintree 200